Srabanti Chatterjee is an Indian actress, former journalist at ABP News and anchor who appears in Bengali language films. Srabanti primarily works in cinema of West Bengal, based in Kolkata.

Political career 
Chatterjee joined Bharatiya Janata Party on 1 March 2021. She was given the ticket and contested the 2021 West Bengal Legislative Assembly election from Behala Paschim against state minister of School Education and TMC heavyweight Partha Chatterjee but lost the election by 50,884 votes. On 11 November 2021, Srabanti quit the Bharatiya Janata Party, eight months after joining the party.

Filmography

Film

Television

Mahalaya

References

External links

Living people
Indian film actresses
Actresses from Kolkata
Actresses in Bengali cinema
21st-century Indian actresses
Year of birth missing (living people)
Bharatiya Janata Party politicians from West Bengal
Indian actor-politicians